Estevan Oriol is a photographer and director from Los Angeles, of Mexican-Italian descent. 
Best known for his distinct, gritty 35mm black and white work, documenting chicano, cholo culture (and Los Angeles gang culture at large), as well as celebrities within film and hip-hop, and lingerie work, his images have been featured in magazines, on album covers and in exhibitions across the world.  Oriol is also known for directing several music videos for the likes of Blink 182, D12, Cypress Hill and more, as well as for his partnerships with life-long friend and collaborator, Mister Cartoon for Joker Brand Clothing
and Soul Assassins Studios, the latter of which the two opened together by way of Cypress Hill's producer, DJ Muggs.

Career 
Oriol was born in Santa Monica, California. He started his career as a bouncer at hip-hop clubs before moving on to tour manage Cypress Hill and House of Pain. During that time he began documenting his life on the road. He has photographed both gang members and celebrities alike. His work has been featured in magazines such as Complex, FHM, GQ, Vibe, Rolling Stone, The Source and many more.

In 2004, he participated in the elaboration of the videogame GTA San Andreas.

Oriol has gone on to direct music videos for rock and hip-hop artists. He has also released books and calendars, including LA Woman, published in 2009 by Drago.

In March 2018, Oriol was announced as the new Creative Director for media company BallerStatus.com. He has also become a partner.

Oriol directed and was the focus of the 2020 Netflix documentary LA Originals, chronicling his and Mister Cartoon's lives as chicano creatives, ambassadors and trailblazers in art, hip-hop and counterculture worldwide.

Books 
L.A. Woman. Drago, 2009.
L.A. Portraits. Drago, 2013.
This is Los Angeles. Drago, 2018.
Bosozoku (Publisher) [Kill Your Idols], 2021

Music videos - directed 
 "Psycho City Blocks" by Psycho Realm
 "Stone Garden" by Psycho Realm
 "No Entiendes La Onda" (How I Could Just Kill A Man) by Cypress Hill
 "Red-Emption" by Big Red
 "Dr. Greenthumb" by Cypress Hill
 "Shit On You" by D12 
 "Heart of a Rebel" by SX10
 "High Voltage" by Linkin Park
 "Real Life" by DJ Muggs feat Kool G Rap
 "When the Fat Lady Sings" by DJ Muggs feat GZA
 "Like It" by Screaming Soul Hill
 "Kemuri" by Screaming Soul Hill
 "Funky Beat" by Big Red
 "Not Now" by Blink 182
 "Violence" by Blink 182
 "Obvious" by Blink 182
 "Feeling This " by Blink 182
 "Stockholm Syndrome" by Blink 182
 "Ni De Aqui Ni De Alla" by Jae-P
 "Down" by Blink 182
 "Hold You Down" by The Alchemist
 "What I Can't Describe" by The Transplants 
 "Gangsters & Thugs" by The Transplants
 "Swing Life Away" by Rise Against
 "Criminal Set" by Xzibit
 "Stronger" by TRUSTcompany
 "16 16 Six" by The Drips 
 "Lights Out" by P.O.D. 
 "Traffic" by the Reyes Bros
 "Break Em Off" by Paul Wall
 "La Manera" by Adassa
 "El Barrio" by DJ Muggs feat Sick Jacken
 "Hang With My Dogs" by Omar Cruz
 "Posted On The Block" by C-Murder
 "Like Yeah" by Tech N9ne
 "Do Something" by Dyme Def
 "The Problem Is" by Murs feat Sick Jacken & Uncle Chucc
 "Saturday Night" by Travis Barker
 "Fish" by Bambu
 "Snap Ya Neck Back" by DJ Muggs feat Dizzee Rascal & Bambu
 "Ikarus" by Kontra K

References

External links 
 

Hip hop fashion
American artists of Mexican descent
Living people
Photographers from California
Year of birth missing (living people)